H.E.H. The Nizam’s Charitable Trust is a non-profit organization. It is currently headed by Prince Muffakham Jah - the grandson of 7th Nizam Mir Osman Ali Khan. The trust grants scholarships to around 2000 students every year. The beneficiaries include students belonging to states of Andhra Pradesh and Telangana from 5th to 10th class,  intermediate level, and degree students.

Noted beneficiaries

Sarojini Naidu
Nightingale of India Sarojini Naidu was one of the beneficiaries of this trust, which gave her a chance to study in England, first at King's College, London and later at Girton College, Cambridge.

Controversy 
The officials of the trust alleged that the P.V. Narasimha Rao government officials constantly harassed them by sending baseless notices  In one of the cases, a Supreme Court Judge said :

"This is indeed a Secular Comprehensive Public Charitable Trust which, unfortunately, had a prolonged litigation directing towards bigger scope for corruption by the Government ministers and officials."

See also
Nizam's Rubath

References

Charities based in India
Establishments in Hyderabad State